Otwock railway station is a railway station in Otwock, Poland.  The station is served by Koleje Mazowieckie, who run trains from Warszawa Zachodnia to Dęblin, and Szybka Kolej Miejska, whose trains from Pruszków PKP terminate at Otwock. It is classified as C under the categories of Polish rail stations.

History
Otwock station opened in 1877, together with the Vistula River Railroad. The present day station building was constructed in 1910.  The rail line through the station was electrified in 1936, to serve Warsaw suburban passenger trains.

In the years 2018-2021 the station is undergoing complete modernization.

Train services
The station is served by the following service(s):

Intercity services (TLK) Kołobrzeg — Gdynia Główna — Warszawa Wschodnia — Kraków Główny

References

Otwock railway station article at Kolej.one.pl (Polish Railways)

Railway stations in Masovian Voivodeship
Railway stations served by Koleje Mazowieckie
Railway stations served by Szybka Kolej Miejska (Warsaw)
Railway station